This is a list of Arabic pop-music musicians.  Not all are Arabs, but all perform at least in part in the Arabic language.

A–G

 Layal Abboud
Abdallah Al Rowaished
Abdel Halim Hafez
Ahlam
Ahmed Adaweyah
Aida el Ayoubi
Alabina
Ali El Haggar
Amal Arafa
Amal Hijazi
Amr Diab
Amr Mostafa
Angham
Arwa
Asalah Nasri
Asma Lamnawar
Asmahan
Assi El Helani
Aswat Almadina
Aziza Jalal
Balqees Ahmed Fathi
Carmen Suleiman
Carole Samaha
Cheb Mami
Cheb Khaled
Cyrine Abdelnour
Dalida
Dalida Khalil
Dania Khatib
Diana Karazon
Diana Haddad
Dina Hayek
Donia Samir Ghanem
Dounia Batma
Ema Shah
Emel Mathlouthi
Ehab Tawfik
Elias Karam
Elissa
Fady Andraos
Fairouz
Fadel Shaker
Farah Siraj
Farrah Yousef
Farid El Atrache
Fares Karam
Faudel

H–M

Haifa Wehbe
Hakim (Egypt)
Hala Al Turk
Hamada Helal
Hani Shaker
Hiba Tawaji
Hisham Abbas
Hoda Saad
Hussam Al-Rassam
Hussain Al Jasmi
Humood AlKhudher
Ishtar
Iwan (singer)
Jannat Mahid
Joseph Attieh
Julia Boutros
Kathem Al Saher
Khaled
Laila Ghofran
Latifa
Leila Mourad
Maher Zain
Majid Al Muhandis
Majida El Roumi
Maya Nasri
Melhem Zein
Melissa (singer)
Marwan Khoury
Mohammed Abdu
Mohammed Assaf
Mohamad Bash
Mohamed Fouad
Mohamed Hamaki
Mohamed Mounir
Moustafa Amar
Myriam Fares
Nabyla Maan
Nassif Zeytoun

N–Z

Najwa Karam
Nancy Ajram
Nawal Al Zoghbi
Nawal El Kuwaitia
Nelly Makdessy
Nicole Saba
Noura Rahal
Nourhanne
Omar Al-Abdallat
Omar Souleyman
Pascale Machaalani
Rabeh Sager
Rachid Taha
Ragheb Alama
Ramy Ayach
Rola Saad
Rouwaida Attieh
Ruwaida al-Mahrouqi
Ruby
Saad Lamjarred
Sabah
Saber Rebaï
Salma Rachid
Samira Said
Shada Hassoun
Shams (singer)
Sherine
Sherine Wagdy
Simone
Sofia El Marikh
Souad Massi
Shaaban Abdel Rahim
Suzanne Tamim
Tamer Hosny
Thekra
Toni Qattan
Umm Kulthum
Warda Al-Jazairia
Wadih El Safi
Wael Jassar
Wael Kfoury
Walid Toufic
Yasmine Hamdan
Yara
Yuri Mraqqadi

See also

List of Arabs
Lists of musicians

References

 
Lists of musicians by genre
Lists of singers
Pop music genres